Nicholas James Woods (born 26 August 1995) is a New Zealand field hockey player who plays as a midfielder for German club Hamburger Polo Club and the New Zealand national team.

He represented his country at the 2016 Summer Olympics in Rio de Janeiro, where the men's team came seventh.

Club career
Woods played for the Midlands in the New Zealand National Hockey League. He joined Royal Daring in the Belgian Hockey League in 2016. After two seasons he left Daring for Racing Club de Bruxelles. Before the 2020–21 season his contract was not extended and he left Belgium for the Hambuger Polo Club in Germany.

References

External links

1995 births
Living people
Sportspeople from Hamilton, New Zealand
New Zealand male field hockey players
New Zealand expatriate sportspeople in Germany
Male field hockey midfielders
Olympic field hockey players of New Zealand
Field hockey players at the 2016 Summer Olympics
Field hockey players at the 2020 Summer Olympics
Field hockey players at the 2018 Commonwealth Games
Field hockey players at the 2022 Commonwealth Games
2018 Men's Hockey World Cup players
Commonwealth Games silver medallists for New Zealand
Commonwealth Games medallists in field hockey
Men's Belgian Hockey League players
Royal Racing Club Bruxelles players
Royal Daring players
Men's Feldhockey Bundesliga players
2023 Men's FIH Hockey World Cup players
20th-century New Zealand people
21st-century New Zealand people
Medallists at the 2018 Commonwealth Games